Simone Mori (born 18 November 1965) is an Italian actor and voice actor.

Biography
Born in Rome, Mori started his career on television during the late 1980s. He is the son of actor and voice actor Renato Mori. Among his most popular television roles was in the crime drama Romanzo criminale – La serie but he is generally known to the Italian public as a voice actor. He voiced Ross Geller (portrayed by David Schwimmer) in the Italian-Language version of Friends and Warrick Brown (portrayed by Gary Dourdan) in the Italian-Language version of CSI: Crime Scene Investigation. He also dubbed Seth Rogen, John C. Reilly, Ice Cube and Omar Sy in a majority of their movies.

In Mori's animated roles, he dubbed Hermes Conrad in Futurama, Mantis in the Kung Fu Panda film series and he also performed the Italian voice of Shaggy Rogers in Scooby-Doo and the Alien Invaders. Another one of Mori's most popular dubbing roles include Crossbones in the Marvel Cinematic Universe.

In 2003, Mori explored a career as a dubbing director.

Filmography

Television
Una lepre con la faccia di bambina (1989)
Classe di ferro (1989)
Un commissario a Roma (1993)
Romanzo criminale – La serie (2008–2010)

Dubbing roles

Animation
Mr. Hare in The Animals of Farthing Wood
Hermes Conrad in Futurama
Hermes Conrad in Futurama: Bender's Big Score
Hermes Conrad in Futurama: The Beast with a Billion Backs
Hermes Conrad in Futurama: Bender's Game
Hermes Conrad in Futurama: Into the Wild Green Yonder
Police Officer Landers in Monster House
Gutsy Smurf in The Smurfs
Gutsy Smurf in The Smurfs 2
Chien-Po in Mulan II
Vash the Stampede in Trigun
Vash the Stampede in Trigun: Badlands Rumble
Frank in Sausage Party
Phillip in South Park
Nash in The Good Dinosaur
Scab in The Wild
Alistair in Open Season 3
Mantis in Kung Fu Panda
Mantis in Kung Fu Panda 2
Mantis in Kung Fu Panda 3
Mantis in Kung Fu Panda: Legends of Awesomeness
Reggie in Sherlock Gnomes

Live action
Ross Geller in Friends
Warrick Brown in CSI: Crime Scene Investigation
Aaron Rapaport in The Interview
Dale Doback in Step Brothers
Nick Persons in Are We There Yet?
Bakary "Driss" Bassari in The Intouchables
Ira Wright in Funny People
Cal Naughton Jr. in Talladega Nights: The Ballad of Ricky Bobby
Benjamin Buford "Bubba" Blue in Forrest Gump
James "Desolation" Williams in Ghosts of Mars
Crossbones in Captain America: The Winter Soldier
Crossbones in Captain America: Civil War
Varys in Game of Thrones

Video games
Hermes Conrad in Futurama

References

External links

1965 births
Living people
Male actors from Rome
Italian male voice actors
Italian male television actors
Italian voice directors
20th-century Italian male actors
21st-century Italian male actors